Dalbandin Airport  (Balochi: دالبندین بالی پٹ) is a small domestic airport located at Dalbandin, in the Balochistan province of Pakistan.

History 
Currently the United States Marine Corps uses Dalbandin as a base for operations into Afghanistan.

See also 
 List of airports in Pakistan
 Airlines of Pakistan
 Transport in Pakistan
 Pakistan Civil Aviation Authority

References

External links
Asia Times report on U.S. use of Dalbandin Airport
Dalbandin in the 1970s by Group Captain Sultan M Hali

Airports in Balochistan, Pakistan
Military installations of the United States in Pakistan